Luis Alberto Lopez Vargas (born 21 August 1993) is a Mexican professional boxer who has held the IBF featherweight title since December 2022.

Professional boxing career

Early career
Lopez made his professional debut against Francisco Javier Pacheco on 6 November 2015. He won the fight by split decision. Vargas amassed a 16–1 record during the next three years, winning half of those fights by way of stoppage. At the end of this run, Lopez-Vargas was booked to face Ray Ximenez for the vacant WBO International featherweight title on 28 February 2019. He his United States debut by technical decision, with scores of 80–72, 78–74 and 77–75. The fight was stopped after eight rounds, due to a cut above Ximenez's left eye, which was caused by an accidental clash of heads. Lopez-Vargas faced Ruben Villa on 10 May 2019, in the main event of the ShoBox: The New Generation, once again fighting for the vacant WBO International featherweight title. Villa handed Lopez-Vargas his second professional loss, winning the fight by unanimous decision, with scores of 97–93, 98–92 and 96–94.

After successfully bouncing back against two journeymen opponents, Israel Rojas on 30 August 2019 and Marco Antonio Monteros on 21 September 2019, Lopez was booked to face the undefeated Cristian Baez. Lopez-Vargas won the fight by a fifth-round technical knockout. Lopez next faced Andy Vences on 7 July 2020, at the MGM Grand in Las Vegas. Despite coming into the fight as an underdog, he won the fight by an upset split decision. The judges scored the fight 96–94 in his favor, while the third judge awarded the same scorecard to Vences. In his second fight of 2021, Lopez-Vargas faced the undefeated Gabriel Flores Jr. on 10 September 2021, and once again entered the fight in the role of an underdog. He won the fight by unanimous decision, with two judges scoring the fight 100–90 for Lopez-Vargas, while the third judge scored it 98–92 for him.

Following these two upset victories, Lopez was booked to face the undefeated Isaac Lowe in an IBF featherweight title eliminator bout. The fight took place at the York Hall in Bethnal Green on 3 December 2021, and was broadcast by ESPN+ and IFL TV. Lopez-Vargas won the fight by a seventh-round technical knockout. Lowe was floored with a body strike in the final minute of the seventh round, leaving him unable to beat the ten count. Lopez-Vargas knocked his opponent down twice prior to the stoppage, once in the first and once in the second round. Twenty days later, on 23 December 2021, Lopez-Vargas re-signed with Top Rank.

IBF featherweight champion

Lopez vs. Warrington
Lopez challenged the reigning IBF featherweight champion Josh Warrington on 10 December 2022, at the First Direct Arena in Leeds, England. He won the fight by majority decision. Judges Mike Fitzgerald and Adam Height scored the fight 115–113 in favor of Lopez, while judge Howard Foster scored it an even 114–114 draw. Lopez complained of what he perceived to be dirty tactics from Warrington in the post-fight interview, stating: "He even hit me on my legs. I don’t think the referee did his job in protecting the fighters tonight". Aside from suffering a cut above his left eye due to a headbutt, it was furthermore revealed after the fight that Lopez had fractured his left thumb during the bout.

Lopez vs. Conlan
Lopez is scheduled to make his maiden title defense against the one-time WBA (Regular) featherweight title challenger Michael Conlan on 27 May 2023.

Professional boxing record

See also
List of world featherweight boxing champions
List of Mexican boxing world champions

References

External links

Luis Alberto Lopez - Profile, News Archive & Current Rankings at Box.Live

Living people
1993 births
Mexican male boxers
Sportspeople from Mexicali
World featherweight boxing champions
Super-featherweight boxers
International Boxing Federation champions